'Waukesha County Airport/Crites Field  is a public use airport located two miles (3 km) north of the central business district of Waukesha, a city in Waukesha County, Wisconsin, United States. It is owned and operated by Waukesha County. It is included in the Federal Aviation Administration (FAA) National Plan of Integrated Airport Systems for 2023–2027, in which it is categorized as a national reliever aviation facility.

Flight for Life-Wisconsin announced in October 2007 that it would move its operations to this airport in the summer of 2008.

Waukesha County Airport's main runway 10/28 was completely reconstructed in the summer of 2015.

Facilities and aircraft 

For the 12-month period ending April 30, 2021, the airport had 61,471 aircraft operations, an average of 168 per day: 95% general aviation, 5% air taxi, and less than 1% military. In January 2023, there were 213 aircraft based at this airport: 158 single-engine, 20 multi-engine, 28 jet, 5 helicopter and 2 glider.

See also 
 List of airports in Wisconsin

References

External links 
  information from Wisconsin DOT

Airports in Wisconsin
Buildings and structures in Waukesha, Wisconsin